Really Gone may refer to:

 "Really Gone", a 2005 single by Ultan Conlon
 "Really Gone", a 2018 song by Chvrches from Love Is Dead